Shirley Barrie (1945-2018) was a Canadian writer. She was the co-founder of the Wakefield Tricycle Company and Tricycle Theatre. Her plays include Straight Stitching, Carrying the Calf, and Tripping Through Time.

Early life and education 
Barrie was born on September 30 in 1945 in Tillsonburg, Ontario. She was a member of the University Alumnae Dramatic Club at the University of Toronto. Barrie attended Western University in London, Ontario and Carleton University in Ottawa. While at Carleton, Barrie co-founded a college theatre group called Sock 'n' Buskin with Ken Chubb, who she would later marry.

Career 
In 1972, Barrie co-founded the Wakefield Tricycle Company in London, England with husband Ken Chubb. They named the company in reference to medieval mystery plays and a pub in King's Cross. In 1980, the two set up the Tricycle Theatre, dropping Wakefield from the name, at Kilburn High Road. Until 1984, Barrie was an associate director of Tricycle Theatre.

After returning to Toronto, Barrie and Lib Spry founded Straight Stitching Productions in 1989. Straight Stitching Productions produced Barrie's play Straight Stitching, about immigrant women working in the garment industry. The show featured songs by Arlene Mantle. Straight Stitching went on to become a runner-up for the Floyd S. Chalmers Canadian Play Award. Straight Stitching Productions later produced Carrying the Calf, a play for children addressing violence against women from the perspective of young women attending a self-defense class. Barrie was inspired to write the play after reading a Globe and Mail article that claimed that, "81% of Canadian female university students admit to having experienced psychological, sexual or physical abuse on a date". Carrying the Calf won a Dora Mavor Moore Award for outstanding play for young audiences in 1992.

Working with the Workman Theatre Project, a theatre company that integrates people with mental illness, Barrie created the play Tripping Through Time in 1993. In the show, audiences are immersed in a mental asylum and given diagnoses at random. The play dramatizes experiences at the Queen Street Mental Health Centre from 1850 to the present.

Awards and nominations

Works 
Plays:

 The Adventures of Super Granny and the Kid
Beautiful Lady, Tell Me...
Brigid Bonfast: Space Scientist
Choices
The Girl in the Flower Basket
In the Midst of Death
 Topsy Turvy
 Straight Stitching
 Shusha And The Story Snatcher
 Riders Of The Sea
 Jack Sheppard's Back
 Carrying the Calf
 What if...?
 Two Tonic
 The Pear is Ripe
 Revelation
Reflections
Riders of the Sea
Sonjo & the Thundergod
 Hansel and Gretel
 Beautiful Lady, Tell Me...
 Tripping Through Time
 Measure Of The World
 Queen Marie
 I Am Marguerite
Marguerite de Roberval

As editor:

 Prepare to Embark: Six Theatrical Voyages for Young Adults

Personal life 
Barrie was married to Ken Chubb. The two returned from London to live in Canada in 1985. They had three children: Alexis, Robin, and Yiwen. Barrie died at the Princess Margaret Hospital in Toronto on April 15, 2018.

References 

1945 births
2018 deaths
Canadian women dramatists and playwrights
20th-century Canadian dramatists and playwrights
21st-century Canadian dramatists and playwrights
Dora Mavor Moore Award winners
People from Tillsonburg
Carleton University alumni
University of Western Ontario alumni